Gregory Norminton is a novelist born in Berkshire, England, in 1976. 
Educated at Wellington College, he read English at Regent's Park College, Oxford and studied acting at the London Academy of Music and Dramatic Art. He is a Senior Lecturer in creative writing at Manchester Metropolitan University. He lives in Sheffield with his wife, Emma, and their daughter. They are Quakers.

His novels include The Ship of Fools (2002), Arts and Wonders (2004), Ghost Portrait (2005) and Serious Things (2008), all published by Sceptre.  The Lost Art of Losing, a collection of aphorisms, and Thumbnails, a collection of stories, have been published by Vagabond Voices. In April 2017, Comma Press brought out his second collection of short stories, The Ghost Who Bled.

The Devil's Highway, Norminton's fifth novel - and his first in nearly ten years - was published by Fourth Estate in January 2018.

Gregory Norminton wrote the stories 'Fall Caesar', 'The Poison Tree' and 'The Fortress at Bruges' for BBC Radio 4, and his short stories have appeared in editions of Prospect, Resurgence and London Magazine.

Norminton's work for radio includes dramatisations of The Machine Stops by E.M. Forster and Utz by Bruce Chatwin. His translations include The Dictionary of Received Ideas by Gustave Flaubert, The Little Prince by Antoine de Saint-Exupéry and Belle and Sébastien: The Child of the Mountains by Cécile Aubry.

In 2005 he took part in Planet Action, an eco-reality series made by the global television network Animal Planet in conjunction with the WWF. 
Following his return, Norminton worked for years to create a collection of short stories by major British writers responding to the ecological crisis. In 2013, Oneworld Publications published Beacons - stories for our not so distant future, edited by Gregory Norminton, with original fiction from writers including Joanne Harris, Lawrence Norfolk, Alasdair Gray, A.L. Kennedy, Janice Galloway and Liz Jensen. Author royalties from the sale of the paperback and e-book go to Stop Climate Chaos.

Norminton has been writer in residence at Magdalene College, Cambridge and he was a featured artist at the 2003 International Writing Program at the University of Iowa. He received a Writer's Award from the Arts Council of England in 2003, and another from the Scottish Arts Council in 2010.

References

External links
Murrough O'Brien, 'Gregory Norminton: The eco-activist provides a portentous warning about our treatment of the planet', The Independent on Sunday, 20 January 2008
'Endnotes', The Guardian 29 January 2008
Gregory Norminton's Website
Gregory Norminton's Blog
A review of one of Gregory Norminton's novels

1976 births
Living people
21st-century English novelists
English short story writers
English dramatists and playwrights
People from Ascot, Berkshire
English environmentalists
Alumni of Regent's Park College, Oxford
People educated at Wellington College, Berkshire
English male dramatists and playwrights
English male short story writers
English male novelists
International Writing Program alumni
21st-century British short story writers
21st-century English male writers